The 1962 Tampa Spartans football team represented the University of Tampa in the 1962 NCAA College Division football season. It was the Spartans' 26th season. The team was led by head coach Fred Pancoast, in his first year, and played their home games at Phillips Field in Tampa, Florida. They finished with a record of three wins, four losses and two ties (3–4–2).

Schedule

References

Tampa
Tampa Spartans football seasons
Tampa Spartans football